Jedi is a game engine developed primarily by Ray Gresko for LucasArts. It is very similar to the Build engine used in Duke Nukem 3D. While not a true 3D engine, it supported a three-dimensional environment with no limitations in the 3rd dimension (Z). In Doom, environments or levels were limited to existing in the X-Y plane only – levels were laid out two-dimensionally: while floor and ceiling heights could differ, areas could not overlap vertically. The Jedi Engine had support for areas or rooms (called "sectors") on top of one another. A trait that it shared with the Build engine. In the Dark Forces revision of the engine, the renderer could not display two rooms situated on top of each other simultaneously. This capability was added for Outlaws.

The Jedi Engine also included the ability to jump and crouch, the ability to look up and down, and atmospheric effects (achieved by careful manipulation of 256-color palette files). The engine is limited in its rendering capabilities, however, and used two-dimensional sprites (pre-rendered in different angles) for most of its object graphics. Other LucasArts techniques such as the iMuse sound system were incorporated.

Its lifetime was short-lived, being used in two titles, Star Wars: Dark Forces and Outlaws. The sequel to Dark Forces, Jedi Knight, used the Sith engine.

There have been attempts of Open Source game engine recreations based on reverse engineering the original source code.

References

1995 software
Video game engines